Jake Elliott Beesley (born 2 December 1996) is an English professional footballer who plays as a forward for Blackpool.

He began his career at Chesterfield, progressing through the youth ranks and making his first-team debut in 2014. After seven Football League appearances over three years, partly spent on loan at Shaw Lane, he joined Salford City in 2017. After loan spells at Boston United and Bradford Park Avenue, he was loaned to Solihull Moors before joining on a permanent basis in 2020. His stay there was short, with Rochdale signing him for an undisclosed fee the same year. He joined Championship club Blackpool in January 2022.

Career
Beesley made his professional debut for Chesterfield on 2 September 2014 in a Football League Trophy match against Scunthorpe United, after coming off the bench to replace Charlie Dawes in the 74th minute. 

Beesley signed on loan for Shaw Lane in October 2016 for a month. He made his début against Loughborough Dynamo on 16 October in a 3–0. At the end of his loan spell, Shaw Lane manager Craig Elliott praised Beesley, saying he had earned the chance to play in the Chesterfield first team with his performances. He made his league debut on 19 November 2016, in a 2–1 defeat to Fleetwood Town.

Salford City
In June 2017 he joined Salford City, signing a two-year contract. On 17 August 2019, Beesley scored his first goal in the Football League when he scored a 93rd minute equaliser in a 1–1 draw with Port Vale. He scored again three days later, scoring the opening goal of an eventual 2–2 draw with Plymouth Argyle.

Loan moves
In March 2018 Beesley was reunited with former Shaw Lane manager Elliott when he was loaned to Boston United, initially for a month, and was later extended until the end of the season.

In July 2018 he joined Bradford (Park Avenue) on a season-long loan. He was seen as a replacement for top goalscorer Adam Boyes who had signed for Spennymoor Town. Manager Mark Bower praised Beesley for his impact on the team at the start of the season. On 8 August, he scored his first two goals for the club in a 2–1 victory against Blyth Spartans. On Boxing Day, Beesley scored a hat-trick against Guiseley in a 5–1 win to keep Bradford (Park Avenue) top of the table.

In October 2019, having failed to make an appearance in six consecutive games, he joined Solihull Moors on loan until January 2020. On 8 October, Beesley scored on his Solihull début, opening the scoring in the 20th minute of a 2–0 win against Sutton United.

Solihull Moors
In January 2020 he joined Solihull on a permanent deal.

Rochdale
On 24 September 2020, Beesley signed a three-year deal with Rochdale for an undisclosed fee. He scored his first goal for Rochdale on 10 November 2020 in an EFL Trophy group game against Salford City. After registering four goals and an assist in just three games across the course of the month, Beesley was awarded the EFL League Two Player of the Month award for December 2021.

Blackpool
On 10 January 2022, Beesley joined Blackpool in a three-and-a-half-year deal, for an undisclosed fee, with the club having an option to extend it for a further twelve months. He made his first start for the club on 18 April, scoring two goals in a 6–1 win against Birmingham City.

Personal life
Beesley's father, Paul, was also a footballer, playing at centre back.

Career stats

References

External links

1996 births
Living people
English footballers
Association football forwards
Place of birth missing (living people)
Chesterfield F.C. players
Shaw Lane A.F.C. players
Salford City F.C. players
Boston United F.C. players
Bradford (Park Avenue) A.F.C. players
Solihull Moors F.C. players
Rochdale A.F.C. players
Blackpool F.C. players
English Football League players
Northern Premier League players
National League (English football) players